Upper Normandy is a former administrative region of France. On 1 January 2016, Upper and Lower Normandy merged becoming one region called Normandy.

History 
It was created in 1956 from two departments: Seine-Maritime and Eure, when Normandy was divided into Lower Normandy and Upper Normandy. This division continued to provoke controversy, and many people continued to call for the two regions to be reunited. The two regions were finally merged on 1 January 2016. The name Upper Normandy existed prior to 1956 and referred by tradition to territories currently included within the administrative region: the Pays de Caux, the Pays de Bray (not that of Picardy), the Roumois, the Campagne of Le Neubourg, the Plaine de Saint-André and the Norman Vexin. Today, most of the Pays d'Auge, as well as a small portion of the Pays d'Ouche, are located in Lower Normandy. Rouen and Le Havre are important urban centers.

Major communities

Rouen is the regional capital, historically important with many fine churches and buildings, including the tallest cathedral tower in France. The region's largest city, in terms of municipal population, is Le Havre, although Rouen is by far the most populous urban area and metropolitan area. The region is twinned with the London Borough of Redbridge in England. Its economy is centered on agriculture, industry, petrochemicals and tourism.

Bernay
Dieppe
Évreux
Fécamp
Le Grand-Quevilly
Le Havre
Le Petit-Quevilly
Louviers
Mont-Saint-Aignan
Rouen
Saint-Étienne-du-Rouvray
Sotteville-lès-Rouen
Vernon

See also

Treaty of Louviers
Museums in Haute-Normandie

References

External links

Upper Normandy : a haven of peace  – official French website 
 

 
Former regions of France
NUTS 2 statistical regions of the European Union
1956 establishments in France
States and territories established in 1956
2015 disestablishments in France
States and territories disestablished in 2015